Athanasios 'Thanasis' Garavelis (born 6 August 1992) is a Greek professional footballer who plays as a goalkeeper for Super League club Lamia.

Career
On 20 June 2019, Garavelis joined newly promoted side Volos, on a free transfer.

On 8 June 2021, Lamia announced he had signed a contract with the club.

Career statistics

References

1992 births
Living people
Greek footballers
Super League Greece players
Gamma Ethniki players
Delta Ethniki players
Football League (Greece) players
Kozani F.C. players
Xanthi F.C. players
Panthrakikos F.C. players
Panegialios F.C. players
Volos N.F.C. players
PAS Lamia 1964 players
Association football goalkeepers
Footballers from Kozani